Mohib Mirza (born 18 August 1979) is a Pakistani actor, director, playwright, television host and comedian. 

He is known for his work in film and television industry of Pakistan for which he has been nominated for various awards.

Career 
Mirza started off as a theatre actor in 1999. He was doing Bachelors in Commerce and ran out of funds for the next semester which made him and his friends start a theatre company of their own called Dramaybazz. They wrote and directed an Urdu play, One Way Ticket, which ran in PACC for 7 days receiving an overwhelming response. Mirza managed to raise more than thrice the amount of money.

Mirza made his debut on television in Sahira Kazmi's popular PTV drama serial Zebunnisa, about a girl who becomes the victim of domestic violence. Since then Mirza has acted in numerous television serials, telefilms, sitcoms and TV commercials.

He earned international recognition with his film Insha Allah (2009), winning the award in Best Supporting Actor category at the International Filmmaker Film Festival held in Kent, England. Mirza is the first Pakistani actor to be awarded at the festival.

In 2018 he returned to TV serials after four years with the drama Deedan.

He turned to direction with the movie Ishrat Made in China, an action comedy released in 2022.

Personal life
Mirza married actress Aamina Sheikh, at Karachi. Their wedding was a three-day event taking place from 30 April to 2 May 2005. He met Sheikh on the sets of a show which he was hosting and Sheikh was directing. In an interview given to Jang, Mohib revealed that he had the hardest time convincing Aamina's father and that each meeting with him involved "extensive grilling". Aimed to rumors of their divorce, Mirza himself confirmed it in October 2019.
In 2021 Mirza Married Sanam Saeed in a private ceremony.

Filmography

Films

Television

Telefilm

Theater

Music work
 Hadiqa Kiani's Saraiki single "Dholan" for album Rung (2004)
 Akhter Qayyum's remix video "Kali Kali Rat Mein" (In darkness of the night), for brand Tulsi, directed by Sohail Javed (2006)
 Abrar-ul-Haq's music video "Nachaan Me Ode Naal" (I will dance with her), for brand Coca-Cola Pakistan (2008)
 Call's music video Mere Paas Kuch Nahi (I have nothing), as a mental man (2007)
 Tania and Omer's music video "Tere Liye" (for you), also featured Aamina Sheikh (2009)

Accolades

See also 
 List of Lollywood actors

References

External links 

 

1979 births
Living people
Pakistani male stage actors
Pakistani male film actors
Pakistani male television actors
Pakistani theatre directors
Pakistani male comedians
Pakistani television hosts
Hum Award winners